Rykov is a surname. Notable people with the surname include:

 Alexei Rykov (1881–1938), Bolshevik revolutionary and Soviet politician
 Vladimir Rykov (born 1987), Russian professional football player
 Konstantin Rykov (born 1979), Russian politician
 Yegor Rykov (born 1997), Russian ice hockey player

Russian-language surnames